Si Ayala at Si Zobel is a 1994 Philippine comedy film directed by Junn Cabreira. The film stars Anjo Yllana and Ogie Alcasid as the respective title roles.

Plot
Ayala (Anjo) and Zobel (Ogie) must work for Lilit's (Nova) company in order for them to inherit a fortune of P1 million. Lilit has two nieces Jenny (Jennifer) and Janet (Janet), who are courted by rich men Carlo (Kier) and Joey (Joey) respectively. Soon, Ayala and Zobel will conquer the hearts of Jenny and Janet, and give Carlo and Joey a run for their money.

Cast
 Anjo Yllana as Ayala
 Ogie Alcasid as Zobel
 Babalu as Soriano
 Jennifer Mendoza as Jenny
 Michael V. as Keempee
 Kier Legaspi as Carlo
 Janet Arnaiz as Jannet
 Nova Villa as Lilit
 Jaime Fabregas as Bank Manager
 Gary Lising as Bart
 Don Pepot as Lawyer
 Jan Rivera as Chito
 Joey Palomar as Joey

References

External links

1994 films
1994 comedy films
Filipino-language films
Philippine comedy films
OctoArts Films films